SS-102 or SS 102 may refer to:

 SS Heavy Panzer Battalion 102, a unit of the German Army 
 USS R-25 (SS-102), a United States Navy submarine which saw service during World War I